Otisco Lake is the easternmost of New York's eleven Finger Lakes. The  lake is located in Onondaga County, southwest of the city of Syracuse.

History
Otisco Lake's name may have been derived from the Iroquois name for the lake's outlet, Nine Mile Creek, Us-te-ke, meaning "bitter-nut-hickory". At least one older map, published in 1825, has the name spelled as "Ostisco". The name may also have been derived from the word ostickney, meaning "waters much dried away", or from the Onondaga word ostick, meaning "the water is low".

Prior to European settlement, the lake was used by the Onondaga people for seasonal fishing and hunting, however no permanent settlements were known to exist. After the Revolutionary War, lands surrounding Otisco Lake were given to soldiers as payment for their service in the war. The first house was erected near the head of Otisco Lake by Oliver Tuttle in 1804, in what is today the Town of Otisco.

In 1869, Otisco Lake was made larger with the construction of a dam near the lake's outlet, which enabled the lake to be used as a reservoir for the Erie Canal. To re-build the road, a causeway was built out of hemlock logs. The causeway was damaged by storms and allowed to deteriorate before being reconstructed in 1983.

Otisco Lake has been used as a source for public drinking water for residents in the southern and western half of Onondaga County since 1908. In 1909, lake levels were increased by an additional  when the dam was raised to increase the lake's capacity. Today, the lake's use as a public water supply is managed by the Onondaga County Water Authority. In 2011, Otisco Lake provided  of water per day.

Description
The lake's outflow enters first Onondaga Lake via Ninemile Creek and then Lake Ontario via the Seneca and Oswego rivers.

Otisco Lake is located entirely within Onondaga County and is bordered by the towns of Marcellus, Otisco, and Spafford. Forty-two percent of the watershed is agricultural, 33% is forested and 9% is shrubland. Wetlands and open water account for approximately 13% of the watershed. Nearly half of the homes within the lake's watershed are located on or near the lake's shore.

According to the U.S. Environmental Protection Agency, Otisco Lake is affected by nonpoint source pollution from agriculture, residential land use and streambank erosion. Pollution from these sources includes pesticides and fertilizers, sedimentation from erosion and poor tillage practices, and runoff from septic systems, lawns and construction sites. Currently the lake is experiencing severe problems brought on by zebra mussels which were introduced to the lake water via boaters.

Recreation

Closest of the Finger Lakes to the City of Syracuse, the lake is a popular recreational destination in the summer. On the first day of bass season, usually around the end of the second week in June, an annual fishing derby is held.

A county park and a public boat launch are available for public use, and two private boat launches are located along the southeastern portion of the lake.

References

External links

Onondaga County Parks: Otisco Lake Park
Onondaga County Water Authority

Finger Lakes
Lakes of Onondaga County, New York
Tourist attractions in Onondaga County, New York
Lakes of New York (state)
Reservoirs in New York (state)
Reservoirs in Onondaga County, New York